Battle for Terra, originally screened as Terra, is a 2007 American computer-animated action-adventure science fiction film, based on the short film Terra, about a race of beings on a peaceful alien planet who face destruction from colonization by the displaced remainder of the human race. The film was directed by Aristomenis Tsirbas who conceived it as a hard-edged live action feature with photo-real Computer-Generated Imagery (CGI) environments. The close collaboration with producing partner and investor Snoot Entertainment redirected the project to become fully animated and appeal to younger audiences. The film features the voices of Evan Rachel Wood, Luke Wilson, Brian Cox and James Garner (In his last major film role before his death) among others.

It premiered on September 8, 2007 at the Toronto International Film Festival. It was widely released in the United States on May 1, 2009. The film was originally shot in 2D but was made in such a way that a second camera could be added to the film. After the film was shown at festivals and distributors showed an interest in it, a small team was hired to render the entire film again from the perspective of the second camera for a true 3D effect. It won the Grand Prize for Best Animated Feature at the 2008 Ottawa International Animation Festival.

Plot

Mala and her friend Senn are young creatures of an alien race that inhabits Terra, a peaceful, near Earth-like planet that is part of a star system in the Milky Way galaxy and has a rich and advanced culture.

One day, a large, mysterious object partially blocks the Terrian sun, piquing the Terrians' interest. Mala, who is inventive and headstrong, goes against the Terrian rules that ban the development of new technologies without the approval of the ruling council and creates a telescope. She takes it outside the city and uses it to view the object. A lot of recon ships emerge from the large object, come down to the city and start abducting Terrians. Some willingly offer themselves to the spaceships mistaking them as their new "gods".

After Mala's father, Roven, is abducted, she lures a ship into a trap, causing it to crash. She saves the pilot, a human named Lieutenant James "Jim" Stanton. After his personal robot assistant, Giddy, warns Mala that Jim will die without oxygen absent on the planet, she scavenges suitable plants and creates a tent in which Jim can breathe. In exchange, Giddy teaches her human language. Jim awakes and finds out his ship is damaged beyond repair. Giddy tells Mala why the humans have come: centuries beforehand, both Mars and Venus were terraformed and colonized by humans for their natural resources. 200 years later, the planets demanded independence from Earth, to no avail. This dispute escalated into a violent interplanetary war that rendered all three planets uninhabitable. The mysterious object in the sky is The Ark, a generation ship containing the remnants of the human race, traveling for several generations in search for a new home. They arrived at Terra, and gave it its name. Mala agrees to fix Jim's ship, so she can go with him to save Roven. When Mala, Jim, and Giddy return to the crash site, they discover the ship has been moved.

The trio tracks the ship to a secret underground military facility where the elders and Doron, the leader of the council, secretly retain the military technology from prior conflicts. After infiltrating the facility and fixing the ship, they fly to the Ark. In it, the commander of the human army, General Hemmer, takes over the Ark in a coup, and declares war on Terra. Mala finds Roven, but gets detected. A fight with the guards starts, in which she gets captured and Roven, while trying to keep the humans away from him with a laser, unintentionally causes a decompression that kills him and the men. Hemmer tells Jim his goal is to turn Terra into a new Earth. He will drop the Terraformer, a huge machine capable of creating an Earth-like atmosphere onto the planet's surface, annihilating the Terrians in the process. To test his loyalty, Hemmer creates a scenario in which Jim has to choose between killing Mala or his younger brother Stewart. Jim saves Stewart, while discreetly ordering Giddy to rescue Mala by breaking the glass. Hemmer orders Jim to join the space-fighters in charge of defending the Terraformer, while he personally supervises the mission within the machine.

Doron and the Terrian elders allow Terrians to defend their planet with their stockpile of military tech, but are hopelessly outnumbered with an unexpectedly large amount of opposing fighters. The humans drop the Terraformer onto the surface and it begins to poison the planet with oxygen. As the machine is close to completing its objective, Jim finds Mala fighting Stewart, and realized the immoral decision in killing the Terrians. He destroys the Terraformer with missiles while enduring flak fire. The ensuing explosion kills Jim as it consumes his damaged fighter. Mala, Giddy and Stewart steer away from the fireball and barely survive the fight. The Terraformer's scorched skeleton collapses, leaving only one leg standing in its wake.

After the Terraformer's destruction and Hemmer's death, humans and Terrians agree to live in peace. Having abandoned the Ark, they establish a colony on the planet, where a statue of Jim is erected in honor of his heroic actions.

Cast
 Evan Rachel Wood as Mala
 Luke Wilson as Lieutenant James "Jim" Stanton, a human military pilot who joins forces with Mala
 Brian Cox as General Hemmer, leader of the military wing of the Ark
 James Garner as Doron, leader of the Terrians
 David Cross as Giddy, Jim's robot assistant
 Chris Evans as Stewart Stanton, Jim Stanton's younger brother
 Dennis Quaid as Roven, Mala's father
 Justin Long as Senn, Mala's boyfriend
 Danny Glover as President Chen, the human leader in the Ark
 Amanda Peet as Maria Montez, one of the human Board Council members of the Ark
 Mark Hamill as Elder Orin
 Tiffany Brevard as Singer Soloist
 Danny Trejo as Elder Berum
 Phil LaMarr as Fabric Merchant
 Laraine Newman as Toy Merchant
 Ron Perlman as Elder Vorin

Release
Roadside Attractions handled theatrical marketing in North America and used its business relationship with Lionsgate to open the film wide in the United States. Battle for Terra received uncharacteristically little marketing for a wide release film. The television campaign consisted of a small number of television spots on Cartoon Network and a handful of network television ads in select markets. Awareness for the film on its opening weekend was subsequently little to non-existent. This strategy of having a disproportionately small advertising campaign for a wide release was employed only one other time a year earlier with the film Delgo. The results for that film were disastrous as the $40 million Delgo grossed a mere $694,782 on 2,160 screens. The lower costing Battle for Terra fared considerably better by taking in more than twice as much revenue ($1,647,083) on roughly half as many screens (1,159) and continued on to gross $6 million internationally. Battle For Terra opened May 1 in the United States against 2 other wide releases: X-Men Origins: Wolverine (4,099 screens) and Ghosts of Girlfriends Past (3,175).

Home media
Battle for Terra was released on DVD and Blu-ray Disc September 22, 2009 by Lionsgate Home Entertainment. Battle for Terra was released in France in French and English version by Rézo Films on DVD and Blu-ray Disc October 20, 2010 and include a 3D version of the movie with 4 3D glasses. A Region B Blu-ray 3D was released in Germany.

Reception
The film has received mixed reviews from critics. Based on 94 reviews collected by Rotten Tomatoes, the film has an average rating of 5.52/10, and a score of 49% from critics, saying that "Despite its earnest aspirations to be a thought-provoking sci-fi alternative, Battle for Terra lacks both a cohesive story and polished visuals, and fails to resonate." Another review aggregator, Metacritic, gives the film an average score of 54% based on 19 reviews, indicating "mixed or average reviews".

The film opened at #12 in the United States, grossing $1,082,064 in 1,159 theaters with an average of $934 per theater. The film's international box office began May 14, 2009 in Russia with a 5th place opening of $332,634 at 83 screens. Battle for Terra's current worldwide total is $6,101,046.

Accolades

Annecy International Animated Film Festival 2009

Giffoni Film Festival 2008

Heartland Film Festival 2008

Ottawa International Animation Festival 2008

References

External links
 
 
 
 

2007 films
2007 computer-animated films
2000s adventure films
2007 science fiction films
2007 3D films
3D animated films
American space adventure films
Lionsgate animated films
Films set in the future
Films set on fictional planets
Lionsgate films
Films about extraterrestrial life
Fiction portraying humans as aliens
Generation ships in fiction
2000s American animated films
American animated science fiction films
Features based on short films
Roadside Attractions films
Films with screenplays by Evan Spiliotopoulos
Films produced by Keith Calder
Colonialism in popular culture
2000s English-language films